Inver is a small village located on the south east shore of the Inver Bay at the point where the bay opens out into the Dornoch Firth and is in Ross-shire, Scottish Highlands and is in the Scottish council area of Highland. Morrich More, the spit of the land to the North-West of Inver, is a military aerial range, with the village being included in the range airspace.

Community
Most of the buildings are at least 100 years old, mostly single-storey cottages (although highly modernised) originally built for a fishing community, with newer buildings outside the original streets. It comprises approximately 300 houses, a primary school, village hall and a pub. There are no shops.

Fishing
Fishing as a traditional activity continues, although not on a large scale commercial basis. Local catches commonly include mackerel, ling, coley, crab and lobster.

References

Populated places in Ross and Cromarty